The administration of John Lee as Chief Executive of Hong Kong, or Lee administration, officially referred to as "The 6th term Chief Executive of Hong Kong" relates to the period of governance of Hong Kong headed by Chief Executive John Lee, starting from 1 July 2022.

Background and election
With the legislating of the National Security Law constraining the pro-democracy movement and the opposition camp, there was virtually no opposition in Hong Kong. Legislation were passed in the legislature without obstacle, especially after 2021 election which saw electoral changes being implemented afterwards, affecting the composition of the Legislative Council.

In the 2022 Chief Executive election, John Lee, promoted from Secretary for Security to Chief Secretary for Administration a year ago, received the approval of the Candidate Eligibility Review Committee to stand in the election and was the sole candidate of the leadership race, backed by the pro-Beijing camp. Receiving 99% of votes in the 1,461-member Election Committee, Lee was chosen as the Chief Executive of Hong Kong.

Lee received the appointment from Chinese Premier Li Keqiang on 30 May 2022.

Cabinet
It was reported on 16 June 2022 that John Lee had decided on the members of his Executive Council. The official list was announced on 19 June after the State Council approved the nominations by Lee. Four of the senior officials were under the United States sanctions after the imposition of the National Security Law in Hong Kong, including Chief Secretary nominee Eric Chan, former Direction of Immigration. One-third of the cabinet ministers are from the civil service, although the two highest-ranking positions were occupied by former officers from Disciplined Services. Some believed the government will continue the focus on security.

The Legislative Council passed a government restructuring package on 15 June, adding new deputies to the Chief Secretary, Financial Secretary and Secretary for Justice, as proposed by incoming Chief Executive John Lee. Two new bureaus were created, with some existing revamped to transfer responsibilities to the new departments.

Ministry

|}

Other posts

 Commissioner of Police: Raymond Siu
 Commissioner of the Independent Commission Against Corruption: Woo Ying-ming
 Director of Audit: Nelson Lam
 Director of Immigration: Au Ka-wang
 Commissioner of Customs and Excise: Louise Ho

Executive Council non-official members
The new members of the Executive Council was announced on 22 June 2022.

References

2022 establishments in Hong Kong
Chief Executives of Hong Kong
Hong Kong Government